Khan Bahadur Raja Jahandad Khan,  (1849–1906) was  an Indian politician and Chief of Gakhars and a descendant of Sultan Sarang Khan, King of Potohar.

Raja Jahandad took the title of Khan Bahadur on 24 May 1881 and the Companion of the Order of the Indian Empire (CIE) on 1 January 1904.

Recognition 
Khan was invested with the gold Kaisar-i-Hind Medal by the Viceroy of India, Lord Hardinge, in recognition of the many years of service since 1877 he had so loyally given the British Raj in India.

Raja Jahandad Khan remained Assistant Commissioner, Punjab. He was sent as an ambassador of the British Government of India to Afghanistan to congratulate Amir Habibullah Khan of Kabul.

Family 
As a young man, Raja Jahandad inherited the  Khanpur (NWFP) estate containing 84 villages from his father Sultan Raja Haider Bukhsh. Khanpur estate was founded by Fateh Khan son of Said Khan probably in or around 1597. At that time, the estate consisted of 225 villages.

Raja Jahandad Khan married the daughter of the Afghan Amir Sher Ali Khan and had three sons - Captain SultanRaja Ali Haider Zaman (MBE, Delhi Durbar Medal, Delhi Coronation Medal, Chairman District board Hazara); Raja Manochehar Khan (MLA NWFP Assembly 1937) and Raja Safdar Jhang. His grandsons include Sultan Raja Rukan Zaman former MLA Twice, Raja Sikander Zaman (Ex- CM NWFP), (Sultan Raja Rukan zaman was active in Pakistan freedom movement and he was given the medal of independence for his services for Pakistan movement. His medal was received by his son Sultan Raja Erij Zaman in Peshawar by Gen.Muhammad Zia ul Haq in 1986, Sultan Raja Rukan Zaman died in 1963 in a car Accident at age of 42years. His descendants are still styled as Chiefs of the Gakhars and hold considerable influence in parts of the Punjab and  KPK, Sultan Raja Erij Zaman died from  Heart disease. After his death, his son Sultan Raja Sheraz Haider Zaman is the current Ghakhars chief and his coronation ceremony was held in Khanpur as Chief of Ghakhars tribe on 11 December 2017 performed by Shah Mahmood Qureshi and Peer sahab Golra Sharif Nizam ud deen Jami and attended by a majority of Ghakhars tribe and dignitaries from all over Pakistan.

References

External links 

Rawalpindi Gazette (photos of text History of Gakhars)
Indian Princely States
Lethbridge, Sir Roper; Golden Book of India
The India List and India Office List for 1905 by Great Britain, India Office
 Watson, H.D.; The Gazetteer of Hazara District 1907
Who is Who of Princely States in Indian Subcontinent

Companions of the Order of the Indian Empire
Recipients of the Kaisar-i-Hind Medal
1851 births
1905 deaths
Indian royalty